"When You're a Long, Long Way from Home" is a World War I song written by Sam M. Lewis and composed by George W. Meyer. This song was published in 1914 by Broadway Music Corp.

The sheet music can be found at the Pritzker Military Museum & Library.

References 

Bibliography

1914 songs
Songs of World War I
Songs with lyrics by Sam M. Lewis
Songs written by George W. Meyer